Neoharmsia is a genus of legume in the family Fabaceae.

Species
Neoharmsia comprises the following species:
 Neoharmsia baronii (Drake) M. Peltier
 Neoharmsia madagascariensis R. Vig.

References

Faboideae
Taxonomy articles created by Polbot
Fabaceae genera